Poolesville High School is a public all magnet high school located in Poolesville, Maryland, United States.

History
The core of the building was built in 1911 as an elementary school, and as of 1912 the school was the only consolidated (middle and high school) in Montgomery County. Poolesville's first graduates were seven students in 1920.

The current school building dates back to 1953, but has had over 22 additions made since then, with the last major revision happening in 1978. The building housed Poolesville's middle school and high school up until 1997 when John Poole Middle School was built. On June 6, 2022, construction began on an entirely new high school building, set to open in 2025.

From its inception until 2002, the school's mascot was an Indian, and its logo was the profile of an Indian warrior in a full headdress. In 2001, amid some controversy, the school's students and Poolesville Community voted on whether to keep the mascot or to change it to a falcon. Although the students and community elected to keep the Indian as the mascot, at the beginning of the 2001–2002 school year, the Montgomery County Board of Education, under pressure from the Maryland Bureau of Indian Affairs, overruled the vote. Beginning in the 2002–2003 school year, the students voted to change the school's mascot to a falcon.
On January 24, 2022, the main office, guidance office, and bus loop were moved to the left of the original area.

Admissions

Curriculum
Starting in the 2006–2007 school year, honor students in northern Montgomery County ("upcounty") have the opportunity to become a part of one of three magnet programs called "houses": Global Ecology; Humanities; or Science, Math, and Computer Science. Students test into high school during their last year of middle school, and if accepted and enrolled, they are "certificate" students and are required to take the standard courses for their specific program. As Poolesville is considered a whole magnet high school, resident students (if they do not apply and join one of the other programs) automatically become part of a fourth program called the Independent Studies program or ISP but are "non-certificate" and can choose to take specialized courses. The Independent Studies Program is specifically for Poolesville resident students only and cannot be applied for by out-of-district students.

Poolesville was ranked Washington Posts #1 Most Challenging High School in Maryland in 2016, U.S. News'  #1 Best High School in Maryland, and Newsweeks #1 Top High School in Maryland in 2015. The school's science, technology, engineering, and mathematics (STEM) program was ranked #121 in Newsweeks 2019 nationwide survey of  US high schools.

A total of 1,180 students attend the school across all grade levels and magnet programs and are instructed by 65 full-time teachers.

Extracurricular activities
Poolesville fields teams in the following sports:

Campus
Because magnet students may come from anywhere within upper Montgomery County, 18 buses service out-of-area students. For Poolesville local students, there are nine buses.

Notable alumni

See also

Nearby schools

References

External links

Global Ecology Studies Program
Maryland High School Sports and Projected Enrollment

Magnet schools in Maryland
Public high schools in Montgomery County, Maryland
1911 establishments in Maryland
Educational institutions established in 1911